Massachusetts House of Representatives' 15th Worcester district in the United States is one of 160 legislative districts included in the lower house of the Massachusetts General Court. It covers part of the city of Worcester in Worcester County. Democrat Mary Keefe of Worcester has represented the district since 2013.

The current district geographic boundary overlaps with those of the Massachusetts Senate's 1st Worcester and 2nd Worcester districts.

Representatives
 Milo Hildreth, circa 1858 
 Nathan W. Williams, circa 1859 
 Horace M. Kendall, circa 1888 
 John W. Kimball, circa 1888 
 Daniel J. Marshall, circa 1920 
 Ernest A. Johnson, circa 1951 
 George J. Bourque, circa 1975 
 Mary S. Keefe, 2013-current

Former locales
The district previously covered:
 Blackstone, circa 1872 
 Mendon, circa 1872 
 Milford, circa 1872 
 Uxbridge, circa 1872

See also
 List of Massachusetts House of Representatives elections
 Other Worcester County districts of the Massachusetts House of Representatives: 1st, 2nd, 3rd, 4th, 5th, 6th, 7th, 8th, 9th, 10th, 11th, 12th, 13th, 14th, 16th, 17th, 18th
 Worcester County districts of the Massachusett Senate: 1st, 2nd; Hampshire, Franklin and Worcester; Middlesex and Worcester; Worcester, Hampden, Hampshire and Middlesex; Worcester and Middlesex; Worcester and Norfolk
 List of Massachusetts General Courts
 List of former districts of the Massachusetts House of Representatives

Images
Portraits of legislators

References

External links
 Ballotpedia
  (State House district information based on U.S. Census Bureau's American Community Survey).
 League of Women Voters of the Worcester Area

House
Government in Worcester County, Massachusetts